Hellinsia brandbergi is a moth of the family Pterophoridae. It is known from Namibia.

References

Endemic fauna of Namibia
brandbergi
Plume moths of Africa
Moths of Africa
Moths described in 2004